Classmates is a 2007  Telugu drama feature film starring Sumanth, Sharwanand, Ravi Varma, Sunil, Sadha and Kamalinee Mukherjee. K. Vijaya Bhaskar directed the film and Sravanthi Ravi Kishore produced it. The film released on 20 April 2007. It is a remake of the 2006 Malayalam movie Classmates.

Plot 
Ravi, Raaji, Satish, Razia and Baddu were classmates and a group of friends in the 1990s. After several years, they all meet again at their 10-year reunion. Everyone is present except for Murali, who died during their last semester.

Back in college, Ravi was a firebrand leader of the left students wing and Satish was his rival who headed the opposite faction of the students wing. Murali was a hardcore singer. Rajeshwari was a classical dancer who regularly won awards for the college with her dance. After a brief friction, Ravi and Raaji become good friends fall in love with each other. Satish, eager to rise up higher in politics, wants to marry Raaji, who is the daughter of a politician. He encourages Raaji to stand in the college elections, opposing Ravi, hoping to drive a wedge between the couple. He eventually succeeds in doing so during the college elections. In an ensuing incident, Murali dies suddenly. Everybody thinks that Murali died of an asthmatic attack. Subsequently, Ravi abruptly drops out of college, during their BSC final semester  and leaves angrily without telling anyone, hoping to get a good job and become successful. He later clears the exams too. Raaji thinks that Ravi left because of their ongoing conflict. Satish later confessed to Raaji that he was the person responsible for Ravi leaving the college and for separating Raaji from Ravi for his petty political gains. He also told to Raaji that Ravi was a good, friendly and honest person and that she misunderstood him. She too dropped her studies and tried to find Ravi's whereabouts but fails.

Ravi later went to Delhi to join for UPSC coaching classes, since he had a bachelor's degree and studied really hard and cleared the Civil Services Examination and became an honest and successful IAS officer. At present, Ravi is a District Collector in the Maharashtra cadre, moving successfully up in his career as a government officer, and remains a bachelor having completely forgotten his past. Baddu is now married and settled in the middle east as a businessman. Sathish has now become an MLA. Rajeshwari, still unmarried, continues her career as a classical dancer.

In the present, somebody tries to kill Ravi by strangulation. The police investigate but find no clue. The case became really serious since Ravi is a senior government official. Later it is revealed that Razia, the shy and reserved girl in the group, was the one responsible. Her reason is that she happens to overhear Raaji's confession to Ravi to forgive her for her past mistakes and Ravi's talk to Raaji, where Ravi reveals that he was accidentally responsible for Murali's death which was on a fateful night during the college elections. Razia and Murali were secretly  lovers who decided to get married in the future, and her motivation was revenge. On recovering from the hospital, Ravi and Razia subsequently reconcile. Later Satish apologized to Ravi for his wrongdoings and they become friends. Murali's father, the professor later requests Ravi to accept Rajeshwari as his wife as she had been waiting for him for the past 15 years. So Raaji and Ravi decide to get married  and Ravi forgives Raaji for her mistakes and they hug each other and start loving each other once again. Once the truth is revealed, the entire group  reconciles. They leave the college reunion happy, promising that they would all meet again. Ravi leaves in his car and everyone bids goodbye to him. As Ravi leaves the campus, he sees Murali's spirit waving goodbye to him happily.

Cast

 Sumanth as Ravi Kiran IAS, District Collector
 Sharwanand as Murali
 Sadha as Rajeshwari 
 Kamalinee Mukherjee as Razia
 Ravi Varma as Satish MLA
 Sunil as Baddu
 Siva Reddy as Satish's friend
 Kota Srinivasa Rao as Murali's father
 Giri Babu as principal
 Tanikella Bharani as hostel warden
 Sudha as Murali's mother
 Uttej as hostel boy
 Chitti Babu as peon
 Karuna as Baddu's wife
 Ahuti Prasad
 Raghu Babu as Police Inspector
 Rajitha

Soundtrack 

The soundtrack was composed by Koti and all lyrics were written by Sirivennela Seetharama Sastry.

Reception 
Radhika Rajamni of Rediff gave the film a rating of two-and-a-half of out five stars and wrote that "Classmates is on a slightly different track from the ordinary but don't expect too much from it".

References

External links
 Idle Brain Review 
 

2007 films
2000s Telugu-language films
Indian romantic comedy-drama films
Indian buddy comedy-drama films
2007 romantic comedy-drama films
2000s buddy films
Films scored by Koti
Films set in universities and colleges
Films set in 1996
Films shot in Warangal
Telugu remakes of Malayalam films
Indian nonlinear narrative films
Films directed by K. Vijaya Bhaskar
2007 comedy films
2007 drama films